The 1933–34 FA Cup was the 59th season of the world's oldest football cup competition, the Football Association Challenge Cup, commonly known as the FA Cup. Manchester City won the competition for the second time, beating Portsmouth 2–1 in the final at Wembley, winning through two late goals from Fred Tilson.

Matches were scheduled to be played at the stadium of the team named first on the date specified for each round, which was always a Saturday. Some matches, however, might be rescheduled for other days if there were clashes with games for other competitions or the weather was inclement. If scores were level after 90 minutes had been played, a replay would take place at the stadium of the second-named team later the same week. If the replayed match was drawn further replays would be held until a winner was determined. If scores were level after 90 minutes had been played in a replay, a 30-minute period of extra time would be played. The 1933-34 competition was notable in that no second replays were required throughout the competition proper.

Calendar

First round proper
At this stage 41 clubs from the Football League Third Division North and South joined the 25 non-league clubs having come through the qualifying rounds. Chesterfield, Brighton & Hove Albion and Luton Town were given a bye to the Third Round. To make the number of matches up, non-league Folkestone and Kingstonian were given byes to this round. 34 matches were scheduled to be played on Saturday, 25 November 1933. Seven were drawn and went to replays in the following midweek fixture.

Second round proper
The matches were played on Saturday, 9 December 1933. Three matches were drawn, with replays taking place in the following midweek fixture.

Third round proper
The 44 First and Second Division clubs entered the competition at this stage, along with Chesterfield, Brighton & Hove Albion and Luton Town. The matches were scheduled for Saturday, 13 January 1934. Nine matches were drawn and went to replays in the following midweek fixture.

Fourth round proper
The matches were scheduled for Saturday, 27 January 1934. Five games were drawn and went to replays in the following midweek fixture.

Fifth round proper
The matches were scheduled for Saturday, 17 February 1934. There was one replay, in the Sheffield Wednesday–Manchester City match, played in the next midweek fixture.

Sixth round proper
The four Sixth Round ties were scheduled to be played on Saturday, 3 March 1934. There were no replays.

Semi-finals
The semi-final matches were played on Saturday, 17 March 1934. Manchester City and Portsmouth won their matches to meet in the final at Wembley

Final

The 1934 FA Cup Final was contested by Manchester City and Portsmouth at Wembley. Manchester City won the game through two late goals from Fred Tilson, after Septimus Rutherford had put Portsmouth ahead midway through the first half.

Match details

See also
FA Cup Final Results 1872-

References
General
Official site; fixtures and results service at TheFA.com
1933-34 FA Cup at rssf.com
1933-34 FA Cup at soccerbase.com

Specific

FA Cup seasons
FA
Cup